Jacques Daniel Michel Piccoli (27 December 1925 – 12 May 2020) was a French actor, producer and film director with a career spanning 70 years. He was lauded as one of the greatest French character actors of his generation who played a wide variety of roles and worked with many acclaimed directors, being awarded with a Best Actor Award at the Cannes Film Festival and a Silver Bear for Best Actor at the Berlin Film Festival.

Life and career
Piccoli was born in Paris to a musical family; his French mother was a pianist and his Swiss father was a violinist from the canton of Ticino.

He appeared in many different roles, from seducer to cop to gangster to Pope, in more than 170 movies. He appeared in six films directed by Luis Buñuel including Belle de Jour (1967) and The Discreet Charm of the Bourgeoisie (1972), but also appeared as Brigitte Bardot's husband in Jean-Luc Godard's Contempt (1963) and as the main antagonist in Alfred Hitchcock's Topaz (1969). He also appeared in many films by Claude Sautet, sometimes co-starring in them with Romy Schneider, and became a frequent collaborator of director Marco Ferreri, with whom he worked on several films, including Dillinger Is Dead and La Grande Bouffe.

In the 1990s, Piccoli also worked as a director on three films. One of his last leading roles was his portrayal of a depressed, newly elected pope in Nanni Moretti's We Have a Pope (2011), for which he was awarded with the David di Donatello Award for Best Actor.

Political views 
Piccoli was part of the Saint-Germain-des-Prés circle in the 1950s, which included Jean-Paul Sartre and Simone de Beauvoir. He was a member of the French Communist Party in this era. A lifelong left-winger, he objected to repression in the Soviet bloc, and supported the Solidarity trade union in Poland.

Personal life and death 
Piccoli married three times and divorced twice. His first marriage was to Éléonore Hirt. They had one daughter together. He was then married for eleven years to singer Juliette Gréco. His final marriage was to Ludivine Clerc, with whom he adopted a daughter and a son.

Piccoli died from complications of a stroke on 12 May 2020, at the age of 94.

Europe Theatre Prize 
In 2001, he was awarded the IX Europe Theatre Prize, in Taormina, with the following motivation:
Michel Piccoli began his career on the stage - his Don Juan remains celebrated - before crossing to the "other shore", the cinema, finally coming to accept the relativity of travelling back and forth between the two and taking full advantage of their potential interaction. Piccoli captivates us because he is halfway between the clearly defined identity of the film actor and the ductile identity of the stage actor. When Bondy, Brook, and Chéreau turned to him, despite his reputation as a cinema performer, it was undoubtedly because of this receptiveness and adaptability. He was not trapped by an image, but brought a unique presence. He was also ready to take on an unprecedented variety of roles, which took him from Schnitzler to Chekhov and Pirandello, from Shakespeare to Koltès. The film actor was able of step back and make way for his double, the stage actor. What is it that we love about Piccoli? The fact that he is an artist who has lasted over time without turning into an effigy… he provides certainty and maintains a hidden dimension. The light does not expel the shadow, which always accompanies the brilliance of the legendary actor that he is. There is nothing one-dimensional about him. Michel Piccoli is a European figure. In him we do not see so much an international star unaware of borders, but an open-minded actor who strives to cross them. A free citizen, he does not want to become a prisoner and his whole life bears witness to this unquenched desire to go beyond limits. National as well as artistic limits. Michel Piccoli refuses civil indifference. He has never lacked commitment, and has always taken sides and got involved. His ethic is constant, whether as an actor or as a citizen. If he is taken as a model, it is always despite himself. He is not a hero who puts himself on display. More than anyone else, Piccoli has managed to maintain his humanity. A vibrant humanity that continues to guide his actions and his words. Michel Piccoli is an exemplary actor, responsible towards himself and towards his art.

Filmography

Awards and nominations 

Cannes Film Festival
1980: Best Actor Award for A Leap in the Dark

Berlin Film Festival
1982: Silver Bear for Best Actor for Strange Affair

Locarno Festival
2007: Best Actor Award for Les Toits de Paris
2007: Excellence Award

César Awards
1981: Nominated for the César Award for Best Actor for Strange Affair
1984: Nominated for the César Award for Best Actor for Dangerous Moves
1990: Nominated for the César Award for Best Actor for May Fools
1991: Nominated for the César Award for Best Actor for La Belle Noiseuse

Shanghai International Film Festival
1997: Golden Goblet Award for Best Actor for Traveling Companion

David di Donatello Awards
2012: David di Donatello for Best Actor for We Have a Pope

European Film Awards
2001: Nominated for the European Film Award for Best Actor for I'm Going Home
2007: Nominated for the European Film Award for Best Actor for Belle Toujours
2011: Honorary Award
2011: Nominated for the European Film Award for Best Actor for We Have a Pope

Europe Theatre Prize - 2001

References

External links

 

1925 births
2020 deaths
20th-century French male actors
21st-century French male actors
Male actors from Paris
French male film actors
French male stage actors
French male television actors
French film directors
French people of Italian descent
French people of Swiss-Italian descent
Cannes Film Festival Award for Best Actor winners
David di Donatello winners
German Film Award winners
Silver Bear for Best Actor winners
Recipients of the Legion of Honour
French communists